The 2015–16 season is Hibernian's (Hibs) second season of play in the second tier of Scottish football the Scottish Championship, since they were relegated at the end of the 2013–14 season. Hibs also competed in the Challenge Cup, the Scottish League Cup and the Scottish Cup.

Summary

Season
Hibernian finished third in the Championship. They reached the first round of the Challenge Cup, the final of the League Cup and the final of the Scottish Cup, beating Rangers 3-2, ending a 114-year wait for the trophy.

Results & fixtures

Friendlies

Scottish Championship

Premiership play-offs

Challenge Cup

League Cup

Scottish Cup

Player statistics
During the 2015–16 season, Hibs have used thirty-three different players in competitive games. The table below shows the number of appearances and goals scored by each player. David Gray was appointed as club captain for the season, replacing Liam Craig.

  

a.  Includes other competitive competitions, including the play-offs and the Challenge Cup.

Disciplinary record

Club statistics

League table

Division summary

Management statistics

Transfers

Players in

Players out

Loans in

Loans out

See also
List of Hibernian F.C. seasons

Notes

References

2015-16
Hibernian